Richard Richardsson may refer to:
 Richard Richardsson (snowboarder)
 Richard Richardsson (footballer)

See also
 Richard Richardson (disambiguation)